Louisiana Highway 35 (LA 35) is a -long north-south state highway in Louisiana that serves Vermilion, Lafayette, Acadia, and Saint Landry parishes, extending from Louisiana Highway 82, intersecting with exit 87 of Interstate 10, ending at US Route 190.

Route description
From the south, LA 35 begins at a junction with LA 82 located just north of the Gulf Intracoastal Waterway and an area known as Forked Island.  The route heads northward and crosses LA 14 in the city of Kaplan.  North of Kaplan, LA 35 briefly overlaps LA 92 to the west of Indian Bayou.  About  later, LA 35 passes through the city of Rayne, where it runs concurrent with US 90 through the center of town.  After US 90 departs to the east, LA 35 passes through a diamond interchange with I-10 (exit 87) at the north end of town.  This interchange is followed immediately by a junction with LA 98.  Continuing northward, LA 35 passes through the rural community of Branch en route to the town of Church Point.  The route zigzags through the center of town, overlapping the route of LA 95.  North of Church Point, LA 35 meanders into St. Landry Parish and reaches its northern terminus at US 190 in Lawtell.

History
Prior to the 1955 Louisiana Highway renumbering, LA 35 was a road from Amite to Bogalusa via Franklinton. In 1955 the Amite-to-Franklinton segment became part of LA 16, and the Franklinton-to-Bogalusa segment became part of LA 10.

Major intersections

References

0035
Transportation in Acadia Parish, Louisiana
Transportation in Lafayette Parish, Louisiana
Transportation in St. Landry Parish, Louisiana
Transportation in Vermilion Parish, Louisiana